Captain Cowboy is a 1929 American silent Western film directed by J.P. McGowan and starring Yakima Canutt, Ione Reed and John Lowell.

Cast
 Yakima Canutt
 Ione Reed 
 Slim Whitaker
 John Lowell
 Bobby Dunn
 Betty Carter 
 Lynn Sanderson
 Scotty Mattraw
 Cliff Lyons

References

External links
 

1929 films
1929 Western (genre) films
American black-and-white films
Films directed by J. P. McGowan
Silent American Western (genre) films
1920s English-language films
1920s American films